Salimicrobium jeotgali is a Gram-positive, aerobic and motile bacterium from the genus of Salimicrobium which has been isolated from Myeolchi-jeot from Korea.

References

External links
Type strain of Salimicrobium jeotgali at BacDive -  the Bacterial Diversity Metadatabase

 

Bacillaceae
Bacteria described in 2014